Aleksei Vyacheslavovich Artyomov (born 17 February 1983) is a former Russian professional football player.

Club career
Artyomov played in the Russian Football National League with FC Mordovia Saransk in 2007.

References

External links
 

1983 births
People from Saransk
Living people
Russian footballers
Association football midfielders
FC Volga Nizhny Novgorod players
FC Mordovia Saransk players
FC Energiya Volzhsky players
FC Sheksna Cherepovets players
FC Tekstilshchik Ivanovo players
Sportspeople from Mordovia